Singapore Airlines freighters (commonly referred to as SIA Cargo) serve 17 destinations in 11 countries as of 26 January 2022. As SIA Cargo also manages the cargo holds of all Singapore Airlines and Scoot aircraft, the company additionally offers cargo product services to all destinations on the Singapore Airlines Group network.

List (to be fully completed)

Terminated destinations

Africa

Western Africa 
 
 Lagos - Murtala Muhammed International Airport

Americas

North America
 
 Atlanta - Hartsfield–Jackson Atlanta International Airport
 Chicago - O'Hare International Airport
 New York City - John F. Kennedy International Airport
 San Francisco - San Francisco International Airport

South America
 
 Campinas - Viracopos International Airport
  
 Bogota - El Dorado International Airport
  
 Quito - Mariscal Sucre International Airport

Asia

East Asia
 
 Nagoya - Chubu Centrair International Airport
 Osaka - Kansai International Airport
 Tokyo - Narita International Airport
 
 Macau - Macau International Airport
 
 Chongqing - Chongqing Jiangbei International Airport 
 Nanjing - Nanjing Lukou International Airport
 Tianjin - Tianjin Binhai International Airport 
 Xiamen - Xiamen Gaoqi International Airport
 
 Taipei - Taoyuan International Airport
 
 Seoul - Incheon International Airport

South Asia
 
 Dhaka - Shahjalal International Airport
 
 Kolkata - Netaji Subhas Chandra Bose International Airport
 
 Colombo - Bandaranaike International Airport

Southeast Asia
 
 Jakarta - Soekarno-Hatta International Airport
 
 Penang - Penang International Airport
 
 Manila - Ninoy Aquino International Airport

 Bangkok - Suvarnabhumi Airport
 
 Hanoi - Noi Bai International Airport

Southwest Asia
 
 Kuwait City - Kuwait International Airport
 
 Abu Dhabi - Abu Dhabi International Airport
 Dubai - Dubai International Airport

Europe

Eastern Europe
 
 Moscow - Domodedovo International Airport

Northern Europe
 
 Copenhagen - Copenhagen Airport

Southern Europe
  
 Istanbul - Istanbul Atatürk Airport

Western Europe
 
 Leipzig/Halle - Leipzig/Halle Airport
 Munich - Munich Airport
 
 Paris - Charles de Gaulle Airport
 
 Dublin - Dublin Airport
 
 Luxembourg City - Luxembourg Findel International Airport
 
 Manchester - Manchester Airport
 Prestwick - Glasgow Prestwick Airport

Oceania
 
 Adelaide - Adelaide Airport

References

External links
Singapore Airlines Cargo

Destinations
Lists of airline destinations
Singapore transport-related lists